The SS Devonian was a passenger steamer build by Harland and Wolff for the Leyland Line. She entered service in 1900 and was used on Leyland Line's passenger and cargo service between Liverpool to Boston. On August 21, 1917, the ship was torpedoed and sunk by a German U-boat.

References

Ocean liners
1900 ships